Chief Minister of Punjab may refer to:

 Chief Minister of Punjab (India)
 Chief Minister of Punjab (Pakistan)